David Kirby may refer to:

David Kirby (journalist), American journalist
David Kirby (poet) (born 1944), American poet and academic
David Kirby (judge) (born 1943), Australian lawyer
David Kirby (historian), professor at the School of Slavonic and East European Studies, University of London
David Kirby (business professor) (born 1942), professor of business administration at British University in Egypt
David Kirby (activist) (1957–1990), AIDS activist and the subject of a photograph taken at his deathbed
David Kirby (cricketer) (born 1939), English cricketer
David A. Kirby (born 1968), professor of science communication studies at the University of Manchester